Campiglossa is a genus of fruit flies in the family Tephritidae. There are at least 190 described species in Campiglossa.

See also
 List of Campiglossa species

References

Further reading

External links

 
 

Tephritinae
Tephritidae genera
Taxa named by Camillo Rondani
Diptera of South America
Diptera of North America
Diptera of Europe